Sloane Stephens defeated Marie Bouzková in the final, 7–5, 1–6, 6–2, to win the singles title at the 2022 Abierto Zapopan. It marked the first final and title for Stephens since 2018. 

Sara Sorribes Tormo was the defending champion, but she lost in the quarterfinals to Bouzková.

Seeds

Draw

Finals

Top half

Bottom half

Qualifying

Seeds

Qualifiers

Qualifying draw

First qualifier

Second qualifier

Third qualifier

Fourth qualifier

Fifth qualifier

Sixth qualifier

References 
General

Main draw
Qualifying draw

Specific

External links 
 2022 Abierto Zapopan – Women's draw and results at the Women's Tennis Association

Abierto Zapopan
Abierto Zapopan
Mex